Sukhoye Ozero is a rural locality (a village) in Almukhametovsky Selsoviet, Abzelilovsky District, Bashkortostan, Russia. The population was 14 as of 2010. There is 1 street.

Geography 
Sukhoye Ozero is located 48 km southeast of Askarovo (the district's administrative centre) by road. Severny is the nearest rural locality.

References 

Rural localities in Abzelilovsky District